The Clausura 2016 Copa MX Final was the final of the Clausura 2016 Copa MX, the eighth edition of the Copa MX under its current format and 75th overall organized by the Mexican Football Federation, the governing body of association football in Mexico.

The final was contested in a single leg format between Liga MX club Veraruz and Necaxa of Ascenso MX. The match was hosted by Veracruz at Estadio Luis "Pirata" Fuente in Veracruz, Veracruz on 13 April 2016. As winners, Veracruz earned a spot to face Guadalajara (the winners of the Apertura edition) in the 2016 Supercopa MX to qualify as Mexico 3 to the 2017 Copa Libertadores.

Venue
Due to the tournament's regulations the higher seed among both finalists during the group stage hosts the final, thus Estadio Luis "Pirata" Fuente hosted the final.

Background
Prior to the match, Necaxa had previously won the tournament three times, while Veracruz had won it twice. Each team last appeared in the final in the 1994–95 edition, a match that Necaxa won 2–0.

Veracruz won four, drew two and lost none of their group stage matches, earning the #3 seed. They eliminated Pachuca in the quarterfinals and Atlético San Luis in the semifinals.

Necaxa won four, drew one and lost one group stage match, earning the #4 seed. They eliminated Tijuana on penalty kicks in the quarterfinals and Cruz Azul in the semifinals.

Road to the finals

Note: In all results below, the score of the finalist is given first.

Match

References

Copa MX Finals
2015–16 in Mexican football